Gaping may refer to:

Staring, the action of looking intently at something or someone
Gaping (animal behavior), wide opening of the mouth for purposes such as threatening or courtship

See also
Abeyance, from Old French abeance meaning "gaping"
Gaping Gill, a natural cave in North Yorkshire, England
Gape, in bird anatomy, the interior of the open mouth
Gaper Day, a local tradition in North American ski resort towns
Gapes (disambiguation)